Vilar de Infesta is a parish in Redondela, Pontevedra Province, Spain.

Subdivisions of Spain
Populated places in the Province of Pontevedra